Tamara Valerie Smart (born 14 June 2005) is an English actress. She made her debut in the CBBC series The Worst Witch. Her other work includes the 2019 series revival of Are You Afraid of the Dark?, Artemis Fowl, A Babysitter's Guide to Monster Hunting and Resident Evil.

Personal life
Smart was born in the North London Borough of Barnet to parents Fiona and Cornelius Smart. Tamara took classes at Dance Crazy Studios and Razzamataz Theatre School Barnet.

Career
In 2017, Smart made her acting debut as Enid Nightshade in the CBBC series The Worst Witch. In 2018, she had a starring role as Hailey Hicks in drama series Hard sun. In 2019, she starred as Louise Fulci in the third revival of children's anthology series Are You Afraid of the Dark?. In 2020, Smart was cast to play Juliet Butler In the science fantasy adventure film Artemis fowl . Also In 2020, Smart played a major role as Kelly Ferguson in the dark fantasy comedy film A Babysitter's Guide to Monster Hunting. In 2022, Smart starred as Jade Wesker in the action horror series Resident Evil. She voiced the character Siobhan in the stop-motion animated film Wendell & Wild.

Filmography

References

External links
 

Living people
2005 births
21st-century English actresses
Actresses from London
Black British actresses
English child actresses
English film actresses
People from Chipping Barnet
English television actresses